Cristina Tomasini (born 26 July 1958) is an Italian female retired long-distance runner, which participated at the 1987 World Championships in Athletics.

Biography
Her best result at International level was the 5th place at the 1977 IAAF World Cross Country Championships, competition when she won also three important medals with the team, while at European level her best result was the victory at IAAF World Cross Country Championships held in Formia in 1982. She won four times the national championships at senior level.

Her performance on the 5000 metres in 1980, when she was under 23, was the third time in Europe. Cristina Tomasini also won BOclassic (an international road running race that take place every 31 December in Bolzano) edition of 1985.

Achievements

National titles
Italian Athletics Championships
3000 metres: 1977 
10,000 metres: 1986 
Half marathon: 1987 
Cross country: 1977

Circuit wins
European Athletics permit meeting
Cross della Vallagarina: 1978, 1980, 1982

References

External links
 

1958 births
Living people
Italian female long-distance runners
World Athletics Championships athletes for Italy
People from Rovereto
Sportspeople from Trentino